DCCC may refer to:
 800 (number), in Roman numerals
Dallas Chinese Community Center, in Dallas, Texas 
Davidson County Community College
Delaware County Community College
Democratic Congressional Campaign Committee
Derbyshire County Cricket Club
Dodge City Community College
Durham County Cricket Club

See also
 DCC (disambiguation)